International Journal of Public Theology (IJPT) is a peer-reviewed academic journal that investigates the idea and practice of public theology. From its foundation in 2007 until 2017, the journal was edited by Sebastian Kim. Since 2017, the chief editor has been Clive Pearson of Charles Sturt University, Australia. Since 2020, David Moe of Yale University has been book review editor.

Background
Founded in 2007, together with the Global Network for Public Theology, IJPT was established by a group of public theologians active in public discourse in the United Kingdom, such as Duncan B. Forrester of the Centre for Theology and Public Issues and Elaine Graham of Manchester University. William Storrar, founding chair of the journal's editorial board, explains the foundation of the journal as a kairos moment for this emerging field.

The journal promotes the use of different academic disciplines to enrich the discourse of public theology. This includes politics, economics, law and security studies, cultural studies, religion, spirituality, the natural science and the social sciences and the study of globalization. The journal attempts to provide a space for ecumenical dialogue and theological debate on global issues, in light of the emergence of world Christianity.

IJPT is published four times a year by Brill Publishers.

References

External links
Quarterly journals
English-language journals
Publications established in 2007
Christianity studies journals